Sara Rocha is a Portuguese professional pool player. Rocha is a two time European Pool Championship team event winner, having won in both 2018 and 2019 with partner Vania Franco. Rocha is a two-time semi-finalist of events on the Euro Tour, having reached this stage at both the 2018 Veldhoven Open, and the 2019 Austria Open.

References

External links

Female pool players
Portuguese pool players
Living people
Date of birth missing (living people)
Year of birth missing (living people)
21st-century Portuguese women